Georgian Railway LLC is the national railway company of Georgia.

A vital artery linking the Black Sea and the Caspian Sea, it sits on the shortest route between Europe and Central Asia. Built to  standard Russian gauge, at present the fully electrified mainline of the Georgian Railway is 1,323.9 km (total: 1,576 km) in length, consisting of 1,422 bridges, 32 tunnels, 22 passenger and 114 goods stations. In 2017, Georgian Railways passenger ridership was 2,684,000, of which 100,000 were international passengers, the rest domestic.

History 
Founded in 1865, operations started in 1871 between Poti and Kvirila (present day Zestaponi). The first passenger train ran on October 10, 1872, from Poti to Tbilisi central station.

From this central spine, the railway network expanded with links to: Rioni to Kutaisi (1877), Rioni-Tkibuli (1887), Zestafoni to Chiatura (1895). The Tbilisi to Baku line became operational in 1883, allowing transportation of Azeri oil through the port of Batumi. In 1899 the Kars–Gyumri–Tbilisi railway connection between Georgia and Armenia was established. The Khashuri to Borjomi link was built in 1894, with the  Borjomi to Bakuriani narrow-gauge line operational from 1902, to serve the higher level skiing community. The Kakheti railway branch line was completed in 1915.

The second major development of Georgian railways was due to rapid industrialisation and need for better distribution of agricultural products, including tea, citrus and wine produce. This resulted in the construction of the branch lines to: Natanebi-Ozurgeti (1924); Brotseula-Tskaltubo (1934), Senaki-Ingiri-Gali (1930), Gali-Ochamchire-Sokhumi (1938), Gori-Tskhinvali (1940). The construction of the Sokhumi-Adler allowing direct connection to the Russian railway network started during World War II, and was in full operation by 1949.

The new Marabda to Akhalkalaki line opened on 31 December 1986. Presently, plans are underway to rehabilitate this line and extend across the Turkish border to Kars, thus re-creating a direct Kars–Tbilisi–Baku route. (Between 1899 and 1993, rail travel between Kars and Tbilisi was possible via Gyumri (Alexandropol, Leninakan), but that route was broken in 1993 with the closing of the Turkish-Armenian border.)

Infrastructure 

Due to the challenging mountainous geography of Georgia, railway engineers have often been faced with some difficult challenges. In 1890 the dual tracking of the Tsipa tunnel was completed, allowing faster passage of East-West traffic.

On August 16, 1932, for the first time in the USSR, the first electric traction train ran in the Surami pass. The General Electric Company produced the initial eight electric locomotives of Class S for the service, followed by an additional 21 Class Ss built by the Kolomna and Dinamo works between 1932 and 1934. By November 1967 all Georgian railway was electrified, including the Borjomi-Bakuriani narrow-gauge line. (Some lines are no longer electrically operated due to political and economic instability and war, particularly in Abkhazia and South Ossetia.)

Post World War II, from 1946 the USSR army engineers with the prospect of connection to their system introduced modern communications, automatisation and Automatic Block Signalling systems. This was followed by the introduction of on train and guard radio communication systems, a process which was completed by 1949.

Rolling stock fleet
Since Georgia independence Georgian Railway operated a soviet fleet of trains. Maintenance, repair and modernisation were performed at "Elmavalmshenebeli" plant in Tbilisi and "Carriage-Building Company" in Rustavi. It consists of 139 locomotives, 8,122 freight and 114 passenger railcars.

In 2009 Georgian Railway has taken delivery of the first train from an order of eight inter-city EMUs produced by CSR Nanjing Puzhen Rolling Stock, China, at a cost of US$6M each. The 3 kV dc trains have a maximum speed of 130 km/h and each four-car set seats a total of 300 passengers in first and second class accommodation.

In 2016 four ultra-modern, double-decked electric trains of the Swiss company Stadler Bussnang AG were ordered at a cost of US$11M each. The 3 kV dc trains have a maximum speed of 160 km/h and each four-car set seats a total of 530 passengers in business class, first and second class accommodation.

Gallery

Present day 

Following the dissolution of the USSR, the Georgian Government took control of many of the key assets of the new country and undertook an aggressive privatisation campaign. The railway assets of Georgia were formed into the new 100% government-owned company The Georgian Railway LLC – the biggest employer in the country (12,700 employees), which operates under the public law of the Enterprise Management Agency, part of the Ministry of Economic Development. It is charged with both management and maintenance of the rail infrastructure, as well as all operations of passenger and freight services. The team which forms the management body consist of The Assembly of Partners, the Supervisory Board and the Board of Directors. Company revenue in 2014 was $US287 million with a high EBITDA margin of 48.9%, debt was $US560 million. More than 95% of revenue comes from freight operations, more than half of which is transit.

Incidents
Following the 2008 South Ossetia war, Russian army forces entered parts of Georgia and damaged key Georgian assets. This included a railway bridge near the western Georgian town of Kaspi, and application of mines to the mainline west of Gori resulted in the complete derailment and resultant fire of an oil train.

The lines located in Abkhazia and South Ossetia are not under the control of the Georgian Railway. Lines from Nikozi to Tskhinvali (5 km) and from Ochamchire to Inguri River are not in use; much of the track and overhead on these two lines have been looted, and stations such as Gali have been destroyed or heavily damaged. Lines from Psou River to Ochamchire and from Ochamchire to Tkvarcheli are operated by Abkhazian Railways.

Railway links with adjacent countries 

  Azerbaijan – open –  (Tbilisi-Baku line); a through  (standard-gauge) connection proposed
  Armenia – open –  (Tbilisi–Gyumri–Yerevan line)
  Turkey – open – standard-gauge line (Akhalkalaki–Kars); this standard-gauge line is connected with Georgia's  railway at Akhalkalaki.
  Russia – closed –  – via the breakaway Abkhazia – de jure closed since the War in Abkhazia (1992–1993), de facto operates partly by Abkhazian Railway without track from Enguri to Sokhumi.

Modernisation 

Until 2004 Georgian Railway had been significantly affected by corruption. On the one hand, modernization and maintenance of the railway were neglected; for example, out of 11,000 rail cars, only 7,000 were in operation. On the other hand, the football stadium of Lokomotiv Tbilisi, the team of Georgian Railway, had one of the most modern sports sites in the country. General manager Akaki Chkhaidze was arrested in 2004 and spent several months in custody, before he redeemed himself for 3 million US dollars.

The railway company was restructured in the same year, and the general manager became subordinate to a supervisory board. From June 2004 until October 2005 David Onoprishvili, a former finance minister and a professor at Vanderbilt University in Nashville, Tennessee, was general manager. 

As part of a modernization program, 2,445 employees were laid off, while wages for remaining employees were increased by about 17 percent. Tariffs for goods (freight) transport were lowered, while modernized, air-conditioned rail cars and express services were launched for passengers, including four Stadler passenger trains. A program of new and renovated station buildings commenced in 2006. The station building of the Tbilisi central station, excluding the rail infrastructure, was reconstructed and officially inaugurated in May 2010. The stations Makhinjauri (a suburb of Batumi) and Kobuleti also received new station buildings.

The 63 km long Zestafoni–Moliti–Khashuri section (“Gorges” section) is part of the main Georgian railway line across a mountainous alignment, having a gradient with very steep slopes and tight curves. This alignment imposes very low speeds and leads to various operational problems. It takes 1.5 hours for a passenger train to cover the  section and much longer for freight trains because of brakes overheating. For this reason, the company is modernizing the section with the target to increase capacity, reduce travel time and improve safety as well as railway operation.  With a length of 8.3 km the new T9 tunnel will soon be the longest rail tunnel in Georgia and is an essential element of the above-mentioned railway section. The tunnel will consist of two parallel tubes connected with cross passages at intervals of 300 m. The project is planned to be completed in late 2019. First trains will go in 2020, time for Tbilisi - Batumi route will be reduced by 40 minutes.

The direct railway line through the center of Tbilisi was planned to be replaced by a bypass north of Tbilisi. According to the plans: The central station will be closed to passengers, and the existing infrastructure will be dismantled. Instead of a central station, two Tbilisi stations, the Didube station in the northwest part of the city, and the Navtlugi (Samgori) station in the east, will become stub-end stations served only by passenger trains. Because of this, through passenger service and direct passenger transfers will not be possible in the future.

However, instead of the expected reduction of environmental and traffic problems, the reductions are expected to cause more traffic problems, due to the fact that the surface (bus) and underground (Metro) public transport system of Tbilisi is oriented toward the central station. Transportation specialists and railway companies strongly disagree with the costly solutions recommended by Booz Allen.

Sponsorships 
As of 2020, the company has been the official jersey sponsor of the Georgia men's national basketball team.

Gallery of stations

See also 
 Transport in Georgia
 Kars–Tbilisi–Baku railway

References

External links 

 Georgian Railway website
 UN Map

Rail transport in Georgia (country)
Transport companies of Georgia (country)
Caucasus Viceroyalty (1801–1917)
Railway companies established in 1872
Transport companies established in 1872
1870s establishments in Georgia (country)
1872 establishments in the Russian Empire